LeBard Stadium is a 7,600-seat stadium located on the Orange Coast College campus in Costa Mesa, California. It is the home football stadium for both the Orange Coast College Pirates and the Golden West College Rustlers football teams. The stadium opened on September 16, 1955, and is lined for both football and soccer.  

Originally named Pirate Stadium, it was renamed in 1967 for Harry R. LeBard, a community leader and a founding member of the district's board of trustees.

References

External links
 Orange Coast College 

American football venues in California
College football venues
College soccer venues in the United States
Rugby league stadiums in the United States
Soccer venues in California
Sports venues in Costa Mesa, California
Former Major League Lacrosse venues